Hemidactylus taylori, also known commonly as Taylor's house gecko and Taylor's Somali half-toed gecko, is a species of lizard in the family Gekkonidae. The species is endemic to Somalia.

Etymology
The specific name, taylori, is in honor of British army officer Captain R. H. R. Taylor.

Behavior
H. taylori is terrestrial and nocturnal.

Reproduction
H. taylori is oviparous.

References

Further reading
Lanza B (1978). "On some new or interesting east African amphibians and reptiles". Monitore Zoologico Italiano, Supplemento 10 (14): 229–297. (Hemidactylus taylori, p. 268). (in English, with an abstract in Italian).
Loveridge A (1947). "Revision of the African Lizards of the Family Gekkonidae". Bulletin of the Museum of Comparative Zoölogy at Harvard College 98 (1): 1–469 + Plates 1–7. (Hemidactylus taylori, pp. 153–154).
Parker HW (1932). "Two Collections of Amphibians and Reptiles from British Somaliland". Proceedings of the Zoological Society of London 1932: 335–367. (Hemidactylus taylori, new species, p. 342).
Parker HW (1942). "The Lizards of British Somaliland, With an appendix on Topography and Climate by Capt. R. H. R. Taylor, O. B. E." Bull. Mus. Comp. Zoöl. Harvard Coll. 91: 1–101. (Hemidactylus taylori, p. 23).
Rösler H (2000). "Kommentierte Liste der rezent, subrezent und fossil bekannten Geckotaxa (Reptilia: Gekkonomorpha)". Gekkota 2: 28–153. (Hemidactylus taylori, p. 88). (in German).

Hemidactylus
Endemic fauna of Somalia
Reptiles of Somalia
Reptiles described in 1932
Taxa named by Hampton Wildman Parker